During the 2022 Russian invasion of Ukraine and the resulting Russian occupation of multiple Ukrainian towns and cities, numerous cases of non-violent resistance against the invasion took place. Local residents organised protests against the invasion and blocked the movement of Russian military equipment. The Russian military dispersed the protests, sometimes with live fire, injuring many and killing some. Most of the large protests ended in March.

Human Rights Watch reports that protesters have been tortured in the south of the occupation zone.

Timeline

North
On 25 February, the city of Konotop was surrounded by Russian troops. On 2 March, at a gathering of city residents, the city's mayor Artem Semenikhin (from political party Svoboda) said that the Russian military was threatening to shell the city in case of disobedience, and offered to resist. His proposal was followed by a standing ovation from the crowd.

There were protests in Slavutych on 26 of March, as the Battle of Slavutych escalated, with Russians attempting to occupy the city. According to reports, Russian troops had abducted the mayor of Slavutych, Yuri Fomichev; he was ultimately released in time to address a protest rally against the Russian invasion which took place later that day in the city square. More than 5,000 city residents took part in the peaceful protest, until it was disrupted by Russian troops firing warning shots and launching stun grenades into the crowd. At least one civilian was injured.

South: Zaporizhzhia
On 27 February, in Dniprorudne, residents with the mayor blocked roads to stop Russian troops.

On 28 February, in Berdyansk, when Russian troops had already entered the town, residents organised a protest after which Russians removed their technique from the city center.
Similar rallies often repeated. On 20 March Russian troops opened warning shots threatening the protesters and repressed a demonstration.

During 1–2 March  thousands of residents of Enerhodar blocked the city entrance for Russian convoys of military technique.
On 20 March, the rally against kidnapping residents and officials by Russian troops took place in the city.
On 2 April, Russian troops violently dispersed rally with explosions.

On 1 March, in Melitopol, local residents organised a protest rally during which they marched along the avenue from Victory Square to the SBU building, occupied by the Russian military. According to the online local publication Our City, "unable to withstand the pressure [outside the building], Russian soldiers opened fire, first in the air, and then on the townspeople" and "one person received a gunshot wound in the knee". According to the BBC News Ukrainian Service, local residents organised a peaceful protest under Ukrainian flags and accused Russian soldiers of shelling and looting shops. As of 10 March, processions through the Melitopol city center were repeating daily.

From 2 March regular actions were held in Prymorsk

On 2 March, near the village of Vodyanoye in the Zaporizhzhia Oblast, local residents blocked the road for Russian troops. Negotiations were held between the mayor of Vodyanoye and the mayor of the neighbouring village of Kamenka with a representative of the Russian side, who said that if the military convoy passes peacefully through the settlement to its destination, no one would be hurt; residents did not accept this offer. According to the mayor of nearby Enerhodar, at around 15:30 local time, Russian troops opened fire on the protesters, injuring two of them.

On 7 March, there were protests in Tokmak.

East
On 1 March, in Kupyansk of the Kharkiv oblast, the Russian army dispersed demonstrations.

In Starobilsk, civilians blocked roads for Russian military forces. On 6 March, locals tore down and burned the flag of the LPR, which was raised by Russian troops near the local government building and replaced it with the Ukrainian flag while singing the national anthem.

On 4 March, after the occupation of Novopskov in the Luhansk Oblast by Russian troops, local residents protested under Ukrainian flags. According to Ukrayinska Pravda, citing locals, one person was injured as a result of shooting at protesters. On 5 March, the local residents protested again against the Russian occupation and warning shots were again opened on them; according to the head of the Luhansk Regional State Administration, Serhiy Haidai, three locals were injured.

On 5 March, a significant number of civilians carrying Ukrainian flags and singing the Ukrainian anthem marched through the streets of Bilokurakyne in the Luhansk Oblast. The march was stopped by Russian forces. 

On 6 March, there were protests in Novotroitske of Luhansk oblast.

On 8 March, locals from Svatove in the Luhansk Oblast gathered on the streets to protest against the occupation by Russian forces. Russian soldiers later threatened to disperse the rally by opening fire.

South: Kherson
On 5 March, residents of Kherson went to a rally with Ukrainian flags and chanted that the city is still Ukrainian and will never be Russian, despite Russian occupation. The Russian military opened warning fire on the protesters. At the same time, the National Police of Ukraine published a video where a Kherson police officer, holding a Ukrainian flag in his hands, jumped on a Russian armored personnel carrier that was driving past the rally, and local residents supported his action with shouts and applause. 

On 6 March, there were protests in Chonhar under the flags of Crimean Tatars.

On 6 March, during a rally in Nova Kakhovka, the Russian military opened fire on protesters indiscriminately "despite the fact that people were unarmed and did not pose any threat," resulting in at least one death and seven injuries. On 7 March, the Kherson Regional Prosecutor's Office of Ukraine, according to the Part 2 of Article 438 of the Criminal Code of Ukraine (violation of the laws and customs of war, associated with premeditated murder), opened a criminal case on the death of several protesters.

On 16 March, there was a rally in Skadovsk against the of kidnapping of the mayor In the city, civilians removed Russian flags at the government building.

On 20 March, protesters in Kherson confronted several Russian military vehicles and told them to "go home". On 27 April, the city council representatives were forced out, and a pro-Ukrainian protest was dispersed.

In March, there were demonstrations in: Oleshky, Henichesk, Kakhovka, Hola Prystan, Zaliznyi Port, Novotroitske, Chaplynka, and other cities in the Kherson oblast.

See also
 Ukrainian resistance during the 2022 Russian invasion of Ukraine
 2022 anti-war protests in Russia
 Occupied territories of Ukraine
 Russian-occupied territories

References

2022 protests
2022 in Ukraine
Reactions to the 2022 Russian invasion of Ukraine
Protests in Ukraine
Opposition to Vladimir Putin
February 2022 events in Ukraine
March 2022 events in Ukraine
Articles containing video clips
Resistance during the 2022 Russian invasion of Ukraine